ColorOS is a mobile operating system created by Oppo Electronics based on the Android Open Source Project. Initially, Realme phones used ColorOS until it was replaced by Realme UI in 2020. Realme is still a family of OPPO (ColorOS) Realme UI uses some of ColorOS apps  Starting from OnePlus 9 series OnePlus will preinstall ColorOS on all smartphones that are sold in mainland China instead of HydrogenOS (Chinese version of OxygenOS).

The first version of ColorOS was launched in September 2013. Oppo had released plenty of Android smartphones before then. It was not stock Android, but Oppo did not label it as ColorOS. Over the years, Oppo launched new official versions of the operating system. To make things less confusing, in 2020 the company revealed that it would adept the same numbering scheme as mainline Android, such as ColorOS jumped from ColorOS7 to ColorOS 11

1 with the launch of Android 11. In the future, ColorOS OnePlus’ Oxygen OS and Realme UI will merge together that will appear on all OnePlus Oppo and Realme UI phones.

Version history

Further reading
 How OPPO's ColorOS 13 Pushes the Trend of Android Customization

References

External links
 https://www.oppo.com/en/coloros13/

Android (operating system)
Android forks
ARM operating systems
Mobile Linux
Software forks
Linux distributions